The Alliance to Rescue Civilization is an organization devoted to the establishment of an off-Earth "backup" of human civilization.  This facility, or group of facilities, would serve to repopulate the Earth after a worldwide disaster or war, preserving as much as possible of both the sciences and the arts. The organization is currently calling for such a backup facility to be built on the Moon in lieu of NASA's plan to return there by 2024.

It was founded by the author and journalist William E. Burrows and the biochemist Robert Shapiro.

References

External links
The Alliance to Rescue Civilization - An Organizational Framework - Internet Archive
ARC website
An Alliance to Rescue Civilization, Ad Astra, 1999
 

Emergency organizations
Space exploration